2001 hurricane season may refer to: 

2001 Atlantic hurricane season
2001 Pacific hurricane season

In sports:

 the 2001 season of the Miami Hurricanes football team